Brownstone Canyon Archaeological District comprises  and is located in the La Madre Mountain Wilderness Area which covers  in southern Nevada. The area is administered by the Humboldt-Toiyabe National Forest and the Bureau of Land Management and includes many petroglyphs.

History 
The district was listed on the National Register of Historic Places on September 22, 1982 for its significance during the period of 1975–2000.

References

External links
Friends of Nevada Wilderness 

Native American history of Nevada
Wilderness areas of Nevada
Archaeological sites on the National Register of Historic Places in Nevada
National Register of Historic Places in Clark County, Nevada
Humboldt–Toiyabe National Forest
Bureau of Land Management areas in Nevada
Petroglyphs in Nevada
Historic districts on the National Register of Historic Places in Nevada